Sebečice is a municipality and village in Rokycany District in the Plzeň Region of the Czech Republic. It has about 70 inhabitants.

Administrative parts
The village of Biskoupky is an administrative part of Sebečice.

References

Villages in Rokycany District